Rais Amrohvi, whose real name was Syed Muhammad Mehdi (1914-1988) was a Pakistani scholar, Urdu poet, paranormal investigator, and psychoanalyst and elder brother of Jaun Elia. He was known for his style of qatanigari (quatrain writing). He wrote quatrains for Pakistani newspaper Jang for several decade. He promoted the Urdu language and supported the Urdu-speaking people of Pakistan. His family is regarded as family of poets.

The Sindh Assembly passed The Sind Teaching, Promotion and Use of Sindhi Language Bill, 1972 that created conflict and language violence in the regime of Prime Minister Zulfikar Ali Bhutto, he wrote his famous poem Urdu ka janaza hai zara dhoom say niklay (It is the funeral of Urdu, carry it out with fanfare). He also intended to translate the Bhagavad Gita into standard Urdu.

Early life

Amrohvi was born on 12 September 1914 in Amroha, India. He migrated to Pakistan on 19 October 1947 and settled in Karachi. He was known for his style of Qatanigari (quatrain writing). For several decades he published quatrains for Pakistan's daily newspaper, Jang. He was also a supporter of the Urdu language and the Urdu-speaking people of Pakistan. He established an institution Raees Academy where writers were trained in emotional and moral values.

He also published a number of books on the topic of metaphysics, meditation, and yoga. He was assassinated by virtue of his faith on 22 September 1988 by an extremist religious militant group.

Publications
Poetry

 Alif
 Masnavi Lala-e-Sehra (1956)
 Pase Ghubar (1969)
 Qattat - I (1969)
 Qattat - II (1969)
 Hikayaat (1975)
 Ba-Hazrat-e-Yazdaan (1984)
 Malboos-e-Bahar (1983)
 Aasaar (1985)
 Kulliyat
 Naseemus sahar
 Zameer e khama

Other
 Muraqabah
 Ma'badun-Nafsiyaat (Parapsychology)
 Nafseyaat-o-Mabaad-an-Nafseyaat (3 vols)
 Ajaib-e-Nafs (4 vols)
 Le Sans Bhi Ahista (2 vols)
 Jinseyaat (2 vols)
 Aalam-e-Barzagh (2 vols)
 Hazraat-e-Arwah
 Hypnotism
 "Tawajjuhaat" (2 volumes)
 "Jinnaat" (2 volumes)
 "Aalam-e-Arwah" (2 volumes)
 Almiye e mashraqi Pakistan
 Achche Mirza
 Ana minal husain

See also
 Jaun Elia

References

Pakistani scholars
Urdu-language poets from Pakistan
Pakistani male poets
Pakistani male journalists
Muhajir people
People from Amroha
Pakistani Shia Muslims
Pakistani psychoanalysts
Recipients of the Pride of Performance
1914 births
1988 deaths
20th-century Pakistani poets
Poets from Karachi
20th-century Pakistani male writers